The Crimea Medal was a campaign medal approved on 15 December 1854, for issue to officers and men of British units (land and naval) which fought in the Crimean War of 1854–56 against Russia. The medal was awarded with the British version of the Turkish Crimea Medal, but when a consignment of these was lost at sea, some troops received the Sardinian version.

Design
The medal consists of a  silver disc with, on the obverse, the diademed head of Queen Victoria and the legend VICTORIA REGINA with the date 1854 below. The reverse has a depiction of a standing Roman warrior about to receive a laurel crown from a flying figure of victory, the word CRIMEA appearing on the left.The medal is notable for its unusually ornate clasps. Each is in the form of an oak leaf with an acorn at each end, a style not used on any other British medal.

Most medals were issued unnamed, but could be returned for naming free of charge – impressed on the rim in block Roman capitals, in the same style as the Military General Service Medal – while some recipients had their medals privately engraved.

Clasps and eligibility
Five clasps were authorised:
Alma – for the battle of 20 September 1854.
Balaklava – for the battle of 25 October 1854.
Inkerman – for the battle of 5 November 1854.
Sebastopol – for the siege that lasted from 11 September 1854 to 9 September 1855.Anyone who received the Balaklava or Inkerman clasps was also awarded this clasp.
Azoff – for the Naval expedition in the Sea of Azoff from 25 May to 22 September 1855. It was awarded only to Royal Navy personnel.

The Alma and Inkerman clasps were authorised in December 1854 at the same time as the medal, with that for Balaklava on 23 February 1855, Sebastopol on 13 October 1855 and Azoff on 2 May 1856.Azoff. No person received more than four clasps.

The medal was awarded to the next of kin of those who died during the campaign.

Troops who landed in the Crimea after 9 September 1855, the day Sebastopol fell, did not receive the medal unless they had been engaged against the enemy after that date.

The medal was issued to Turkish, and to a limited number of French forces who served in the Crimea, unofficial French clasps being sometimes added in addition to the British clasps, including:
 Tchernaia – for the battle of August 16, 1855.
 Traktir – alternate clasp for the bars the Battle of the Tchernaia.
 Mer d'Azoff – for the Navy missions in the Sea of Azoff from 25 May to 22 November 1855.
 Malakof – for the battle of 8 September 1855.

Influences 

The unique design has influenced other medals.

The suspender and the clasp of the Crimea Medal inspired the 2020 design of the unofficial Australian Cadet Service Medal awarded to Australian Defence Force cadets (ADFC) for service to communities.

This suspension bar design of many Japanese military medals during the late 1800s to mid 1900s was closely based on the Crimea Medal. The medals using this design include:

 1874 Formosa Expedition War Medal
 Medal of Honor
 1904-05 Russo-Japanese War Medal
 1937-45 Japanese Army China Incident War Medal
 1931–34 China Incident War Medal
 Japanese Service Medals
 Taisho Enthronement Commemorative Medal 1915

See also

:Category:Recipients of the Crimea Medal
Baltic Medal
Turkish Crimean War medal
Turkish Order of the Medjidie
Sardinian Crimea Medal
Légion d'honneur
Médaille militaire
Crimean War medal (disambiguation)

Notes

Bibliography

External links
The Crimean War Medal by Mike Hargreave Mawson
Illustrated Identification Guide to Crimean War Medals

Crimean War
British campaign medals
1854 establishments in the United Kingdom
Awards established in 1854